The 1960 Summer Paralympics marked the introduction of the sport of Dartchery as a paralympic sport. Dartchery at the 1960 games was a mixed pairs event.

Medal summary

References 

 

1960 Summer Paralympics events
1960